Heidi Witzig (born 1944 in Zurich), formerly known as Heidi Schäppi-Witzig and now as Heidi Witzig Vetterli, is a Swiss historian.

Biography
Witzig is the daughter of an office furniture manufacturer. She grew up in Frauenfeld in the canton of Thurgau. She studied history and art history at the universities of Zurich and Florence and earned a doctorate in Zurich with a work about the early Italian Renaissance in 1978. She subsequently worked as a documentalist at Schweizer Fernsehen DSR. She has been a freelance historian since 1986, with a focus on Alltagsgeschichte and women's history. Her works were "motivated for a long time by the anger against the unequal treatment of women".

Around 1982, she became a Socialist municipality councillor in Uster, canton of Zurich.

As a co-initiator of the GrossmütterRevolution ("Grandmothers' Revolution"), she engages in favour of "women in retiring age for a maturity in dignity and social protection for all".

Heidi Witzig is a widowed mother of a daughter.

Publications (selection) 
 As an author
 Heidi Schäppi-Witzig: Die Florentiner Bürger und ihre Stadt: Eine kulturgeschichtliche Analyse des 15. Jahrhunderts. Zurich: Reihe W, 1978 (dissertation).
 with Elisabeth Joris: Brave Frauen – aufmüpfige Weiber: Wie sich die Industrialisierung auf Alltag und Lebenszusammenhänge von Frauen auswirkte (1820–1940). Zurich: Chronos, 1992; 3rd edition in 2001.
 Polenta und Paradeplatz: Regionales Alltagsleben auf dem Weg zur modernen Schweiz 1880–1914. Zurich: Chronos, 2000; 2nd edition in 2001.
 Wie kluge Frauen alt werden: Was sie tun und was sie lassen. Mit Porträts von Sabine Bobst. Xanthippe, Zürich 2007; 3rd edition in 2008; pocket book edition in 2012.

 As an editor
 with Elisabeth Joris: Frauengeschichte(n): Dokumente aus zwei Jahrhunderten zur Situation der Frauen in der Schweiz. Zurich: Limmat, 1986; 4th edition in 2001.
 with Felix Müller and Kathrin Arioli: Unruhige Verhältnisse: Frauen und Männer im Zeitalter der Gleichberechtigung. 15 Porträts aus dem Kanton Zürich. Zurich: Limmat, 2002.

References

External links
 
 
 

1944 births
Living people
19th-century Swiss historians
Swiss women historians
21st-century Swiss historians
Women's historians
Swiss feminists
Socialist feminists
Feminist historians
20th-century Swiss politicians
20th-century Swiss women politicians
Social Democratic Party of Switzerland politicians
Women local politicians
University of Zurich alumni
Politicians from Zürich
People from Uster
People from Frauenfeld